University Club may refer to:

 University Club (Portland, Oregon)
 University Club (Rochester, New York)
 University Club (University of Pittsburgh), Pennsylvania
 University Club of Baton Rouge, Louisiana
 University Club of Chicago, Illinois
 University Club of Jacksonville, Florida
 University Club of Kansas City (1901-2001), which merged into the Kansas City Club
 University Club of Kentucky, Lexington, Kentucky
 University Club of Milwaukee, Wisconsin
 University Club of New York, New York
 University Club of Washington, DC

See also
 Columbia University Club of New York
 Cornell Club of New York
 Harvard Club of Boston
 Harvard Club of New York
 Penn Club of New York City
 Princeton Club
 Williams Club
 Yale Club
 List of traditional gentlemen's clubs in the United States
 List of universities with BDSM clubs